Electrotherm (India) Limited was founded in 1983 to cater to the needs of all segments of steel industry, foundries and heat treatment industry. Today, Electrotherm is a diversified conglomerate having businesses in the field of Engineering & Projects catering to steel and foundry industry; transformer manufacturing; steel making; ductile iron pipe making; manufacturing of battery operated vehicles; renewable energy; transmission line tower and education.

Electrotherm (India) Limited incorporated in 1983 is India’s largest manufacturer of Induction Melting Furnaces used for steel making. More than 25 million tons of steel is produced every year in India on Induction Melting Furnaces supplied by Electrotherm over the last 30 years. Electrotherm has supplied more than 5500 equipment to over 3000 customers in 58 countries.
Electrotherm is engaged in multi-divisional activities viz. manufacturing of industrial induction furnaces, induction heating equipment, DC Arc Furnaces, Transformers, metal refining converters, high grade pig iron, sponge iron, billets, structural, TMT bars, DI pipes, Alloy steel and battery driven vehicles.

Electrotherm was established in 1983, and initially built industrial furnaces for the steel and metals industry. The company is best known for its YO Bykes range of electric vehicles launched in 2005.

There are four divisions in Electrotherm:

Engineering & Technologies Division

Engineering & Technologies is the oldest division of the Company. The division manufactures capital equipment for metallurgical industry & steel industry and transformers, etc.
The company has also introduced High Speed Modular Caster (HSMC) for direct rolling of billets which has substantially brought down the cost of rolling through a huge saving in fuel consumption and burning losses in the billet reheating furnaces.

Steel Division

Electrotherm has built a mini steel plant of 0.36 million TPA capacity. The plant consists of Sponge Iron kilns, Induction Melting Furnace, Rolling Mills & 30MW Captive Power Plant. The plant also consists of LRF allowing it to produce low sulphur, low phosphorus alloy steel grades for forging applications. There are 2 rolling mills – TMT mill with a capacity of 180,000 TPA & structure mill with a capacity of 72,000 TPA. The structure mill is certified by Power Grid (PGCIL). The plant also consists of AOD for Stainless Steel making with a total installed capacity of 120,000 TPA.
Products include value-added Stainless Steel, TMT bars for construction application, Angles for transmission line and wind mills application, and MS & Carbon steel/ low alloy steel billets for forging applications

Ductile Iron Pipe Division

Electrotherm has emerged as the third largest player in the Ductile Iron Pipe market. Electrotherm has established a production capacity of 0.2 million TPA to produce pipes of 80 to 1200mm diameter at Kutch plant. BIS approvals up to 1200 mm already received. The Plant consists of 2 mini Blast Furnaces (200,000 TPA), Sinter Plant (300,000 TPA) and Centrifugal Pipe Casting and processing (1,92,000 TPA)

Electric Vehicle Division 
Electrotherm makes electric motorcycles under the brand YObykes, and was the largest electric two-wheeler manufacturer in India in 2013.

Products
Electrotherm's range of products span:
 Induction furnace
 Electric arc furnace
 Submerged arc furnace
 Ladle Refining Furnace 
 Ductile iron pipe
 Specialized Steel
 Power transformer
 Renewable energy
 Electric vehicle
 Transformer
 Continuous casting machine
 Induction heating and Hardening Equipment
 Super ductile TMT Bars

References

Companies based in Gujarat
Electric vehicle manufacturers of India
Steel plants of India
1983 establishments in Gujarat
Indian companies established in 1983
Companies listed on the National Stock Exchange of India
Companies listed on the Bombay Stock Exchange